

Napperby is a locality in the Mid North of South Australia in the approach to the lower Flinders Ranges and is near Mount Remarkable National Park and the town of Crystal Brook.

The 2016 Australian census which was conducted in August 2016 reports that Napperby  had a population of 665 of which 284 lived in its town centre.

Napperby is located within the federal division of Grey, the state electoral district of Frome and the local government area of the Port Pirie Regional Council.

References

Towns in South Australia